Phyllonycteris is a genus of bat in the family Phyllostomidae. 
It contains the following species:
 Jamaican Flower Bat (Phyllonycteris aphylla)
 † Puerto Rican Flower Bat (Phyllonycteris major)
 Cuban Flower Bat (Phyllonycteris poeyi)

 
Bat genera
Taxa named by Juan Gundlach
Taxonomy articles created by Polbot

hu:Antillai virágdenevérek